Gymnopilus crociphyllus is a species of mushroom in the family Hymenogastraceae.

See also

List of Gymnopilus species

References

External links
Gymnopilus crociphyllus at Index Fungorum

crociphyllus